Privacy is the second studio album by French singer, songwriter, and model Ophelie Winter. It was released on 28 August 1998 and was recorded from 1997 through to early 1998, enlisting various producers and songwriters worldwide such as Soulshock & Karlin, Guy Roche, Rick Mitra, Shelly Peiken, Anders Bagge, and Shana Morrison. Privacy encompasses Pop Rock, R&B, retro and contemporary pop. The album marked a drastic sound change from her previous effort, No Soucy !, as she departed from her earlier New Jack Swing style, which was her signature style, to a more polished Pop and Funk sound.  Winter chose more personal and mature songs on the album that dealt with the themes of being in the public eye, relationships, love, women empowerment, and sexual abuse. Upon the release, the album was critically panned by critics and considered a sophomore slump compared to her previous effort.

Background 
Following the release of her successful debut album, No Soucy !, in 1996 as a result of hosting on variety shows such as M6, Dance Machine 4, and Hit Machine earlier in her career. This essentially catapulted her into more avenues of the limelight, she starred and appeared in numerous French films, most notably, Folle D'elle, Hommes, femmes, mode d'emploi, and Tout doit disparaître.

Production
The album was recorded from 1997 through early 1998 and was recorded in France, Sweden, England as well as the United States.

Release and promotion
Privacy was released on August 28, 1998 as a CD and Vinyl. Winter went on a promotional tour to support the album. A series of concerts were planned to be held at The Olympia in Paris and another venue in Toulouse, however, it was scrapped a couple of weeks before. "Je Cours" was released a promo single in early 1999, however due to lack of promotion, the song did not chart.

A deluxe edition, as well as a Digipack, were issued in late 1999. The reissue featured a slightly altered cover of the original album cover, as well as two new songs and remixes. The lead single for the reissue, "Je T'abandonne" was released on October 26, 1999. To promote the album, Winter appeared on several national talk shows and radio interviews. on January 22, 2000 in Cannes, Winter was the first presenter for the first ever NRJ Music Award. "Ce Que Je Suis" was released as the last single from Privacy released on February 22, 2000. To promote the song as well the reissue, a series of commercials were issued.

Critical reception 

Privacy was critically panned upon its release. Many criticized her stray from her signature sound, especially for the lead single "Je Marche A L'envers". Michael Ferreira of Allmusic noted the album lacked in production and writing compared to her debut album. He also stated that much of the album felt like was made of filler and contained a mixture of lacking jazz and funk songs and solid R&B and Pop.

Charts

References

1998 albums
Pop albums by French artists